C. laeta may refer to:

 Callirhipis laeta, a polyphagan beetle
 Canna laeta, a garden plant
 Capsula laeta, a North American moth
 Carex laeta, a grassy plant
 Carmenta laeta, a clearwing moth
 Cepora laeta, a Timorese butterfly
 Cerbera laeta, an evergreen plant
 Cercomacra laeta, a bird endemic to Brazil
 Chalcophorotaenia laeta, a jewel beetle
 Chersotis laeta, an owlet moth
 Clavatula laeta, a sea snail
 Clivina laeta, a ground beetle
 Coenosia laeta, a true fly
 Collonia laeta, a sea snail
 Colopea laeta, a spider that produces ecribellate silk
 Cynorkis laeta, an orchidoid orchid
 Cypella laeta, a northeastern Argentinian plant